Hank Gannon is a fictional character from the American ABC soap opera One Life to Live.

Casting
The role of Hank was originated by actor Nathan Purdee on January 31, 1992. Purdee continued regularly appearing in the role until July 18, 2003, and he returned for three episodes in April 2009.

Storylines

Divorced attorney Hank Gannon arrives in fictional Llanview hired to defend Sarah Gordon Buchanan (Jensen Buchanan) in the murder of Carlo Hesser (Thom Christopher). In 1993, he finds himself as the prosecuting district attorney head-to-head against ex-wife Nora Hanen (Hillary B. Smith) in the infamous Todd Manning and Marty Saybrooke rape trial. Nora throws the case upon uncovering evidence implicating Todd in the rape, although Todd never serves jail time.

After years of prosecuting Llanview criminals, Hank leaves his post as district attorney in 2003 after mishandling of the Mitch Laurence (Roscoe Born) murder case. He returns to Llanview with his daughter Rachel in April 2009 upon the news that Nora's son Matthew (Eddie Alderson) was paralyzed in a car accident.

References

External links
Nathan Purdee as Hank Gannon – ABC.com (archived)
Hank Gannon profile – SoapCentral.com

One Life to Live characters
Television characters introduced in 1992
Fictional lawyers
Fictional African-American people
American male characters in television